The Sakhalin stickleback (Pungitius tymensis) is a fish of the family Gasterosteidae. It is a freshwater benthopelagic fish, that grows up to 7.0 cm in length. It is endemic to the islands of Hokkaido and Sakhalin.

References

Sakhalin stickleback
Sakhalin stickleback
Fauna of Sakhalin
Freshwater fish of Japan
Sakhalin stickleback
Taxa named by Alexander Nikolsky